Mathematicism is 'the effort to employ the formal structure and rigorous method of mathematics as a model for the conduct of philosophy'. or else  it is the  epistemological view that reality is fundamentally  mathematical. The term has been applied to a number of philosophers, including Pythagoras and René Descartes although the term is not used by themselves. 

The role of mathematics in Western philosophy has grown and expanded from Pythagoras onwards. Pythagoras is often quoted as first saying "everything is number," and although there is no direct evidence he said this, it is clear that numbers held a particular importance for the Pythagorean school, although it was the later work of Plato that attracts the label of mathematicism from modern philosophers. Furthermore it is René Descartes who provides the first mathematical epistemology which he describes as a mathesis universalis, and which is also referred to as mathematicism.

Pythagoras 

Although we don't have writings of Pythagoras himself, good evidence that he pioneered the concept of mathematicism is given by Plato, and summed up in the quotation often attributed to him that "everything is mathematics". Aristotle says of the Pythagorean school:

Further evidence for the views of Pythagoras and his school, although fragmentary and sometimes contradictory, comes from Alexander Polyhistor. Alexander tells us that central doctrines of the Pythagorieans were  the harmony of numbers and the ideal that the mathematical world has primacy over, or can account for the existence of, the physical world.

According to Aristotle, the Pythagoreans used mathematics for solely mystical reasons, devoid of practical application. They believed that all things were made of numbers. The number one (the monad) represented the origin of all things and other numbers similarly had symbolic representations. Nevertheless modern scholars debate whether this numerology was taught by Pythagoras himself or whether it was original to the later philosopher of the Pythagorean school, Philolaus of Croton. 

Walter Burkert argues in his study Lore and Science in Ancient Pythagoreanism, that the only mathematics the Pythagoreans ever actually engaged in was simple, proofless arithmetic, but that these arithmetic discoveries did contribute significantly to the beginnings of mathematics.

Plato 

The Pythagorian school influenced the work of Plato. Mathematical Platonism is the metaphysical view that (a) there are abstract mathematical objects whose existence is independent of us, and (b) there are true mathematical sentences that provide true descriptions of such objects. The independence of the mathematical objects is such that they are non physical and do not exist in space or time.  Neither does their existence rely on thought or language. For this reason, mathematical proofs are discovered, not invented. The proof existed before its discovery, and merely became known to the one who discovered it.

In summary, therefore, Mathematical Platonism can be reduced to three propositions:

 Existence. There are mathematical objects.
 Abstractness. Mathematical objects are abstract.
 Independence. Mathematical objects are independent of intelligent agents and their language, thought, and practices.

It is again not clear the extent to which Plato held to these views himself but they were associated with the Platonist school. Nevertheless, this was a significant progression in the ideas of mathematicism.

Markus Gabriel refers to Plato in his Fields of Sense: A New Realist Ontology, and in so doing provides a definition for mathematicism. He says:

He goes on, however, to show that the term need not be applied merely to the set-theroetical ontology that he takes issue with, but for other mathematical ontologies.

René Descartes 

Although mathematical methods of investigation have been used to establish meaning and analyse the world since Pythagoras, it was Descartes who pioneered the subject as epistemology, setting out Rules for the Direction of the Mind. He proposed that method, rather than intuition, should direct the mind, saying: 

In the discussion of Rule Four, Descartes' describes what he calls mathesis universalis:

The concept of mathesis universalis was, for Descartes, a universal science modeled on mathematics. It is this mathesis universalis that is referred to when writers speak of Descartes' mathematicism.
Following Descartes, Leibniz attempted to derive connections between mathematical logic, algebra, infinitesimal calculus, combinatorics, and universal characteristics in an incomplete treatise titled "Mathesis Universalis", published in 1695. Following on from Leibniz, Benedict de Spinoza and then various 20th century philosophers, including Bertrand Russell, Ludwig Wittgenstein, and Rudolf Carnap have attempted to elaborate and develop Leibniz's work on mathematical logic, syntactic systems and their calculi and to resolve problems in the field of metaphysics.

Gottfried Leibniz 
Leibniz attempted to work out the possible connections between mathematical logic, algebra, infinitesimal calculus, combinatorics, and universal characteristics in an incomplete treatise titled "Mathesis Universalis" in 1695.

In his account of mathesis universalis, Leibniz proposed a dual method of universal synthesis and analysis for the ascertaining truth, described in De Synthesi et Analysi universale seu Arte inveniendi et judicandi (1890).

Ludwig Wittgenstein 

One of the perhaps most prominent critics of the idea of mathesis universalis was Ludwig Wittgenstein and his philosophy of mathematics. As Anthropologist Emily Martin notes:

Bertrand Russell and Alfred North Whitehead 

The Principia Mathematica is a three-volume work on the foundations of mathematics written by the mathematicians Alfred North Whitehead and Bertrand Russell and published in 1910, 1912, and 1913.  According to its introduction, this work had three aims: 

 to analyze to the greatest possible extent the ideas and methods of mathematical logic and to minimize the number of primitive notions, axioms, and inference rules; 
 to precisely express mathematical propositions in symbolic logic using the most convenient notation that precise expression allows; 
 to solve the paradoxes that plagued logic and set theory at the turn of the 20th century, like Russell's paradox.

There is no doubt that Principia Mathematica is of great importance in the history of mathematics and philosophy: as Irvine has noted, it sparked interest in symbolic logic and advanced the subject by popularizing it; it showcased the powers and capacities of symbolic logic; and it showed how advances in philosophy of mathematics and symbolic logic could go hand-in-hand with tremendous fruitfulness. Indeed, the work  was in part brought about by an interest in logicism, the view on which all mathematical truths are logical truths. It was in part thanks to the advances made in Principia Mathematica that, despite its defects, numerous advances in meta-logic were made, including Gödel's incompleteness theorems.

Michel Foucault 
In The Order of Things, Michel Foucault discuses mathesis as the conjunction point in the ordering of simple natures and algebra, paralleling his concept of taxinomia. Though omitting explicit references to universality, Foucault uses the term to organise and interpret all of human science, as is evident in the full title of his book: "The Order of Things: An Archaeology of the Human Sciences".

Tim Maudlin 
Tim Maudlin's mathematical universe hypothesis attempts to construct "a rigorous mathematical structure using primitive terms that give a natural fit with physics" and investigating why mathematics should provide such a powerful language for describing the physical world. According to Maudlin, "the most satisfying possible answer to such a question is: because the physical world literally has a mathematical structure".

See also

 Digital Physics
 Mathematical Psychology
 Modern Platonism
 Unit-point atomism
 Wolfram Physics Project
 Characteristica universalis
 De Arte Combinatoria
 An Essay towards a Real Character, and a Philosophical Language
 Lingua generalis

References

Bibliography 

 
 
 

 

 
 

 

 

 

 

 
 
 

 

 
 *

External links 
 Raul Corazzon's Ontology web page: Mathesis Universalis with a bibliography

 
 
 

German idealism
Metaphysical theories
Neopythagoreanism
Platonism
Pythagorean philosophy
Rationalism
Theories in ancient Greek philosophy